Solotvyno (also Solotvina) (and , , ,  (Selotfine)) is an urban-type settlement in Tiachiv Raion in Zakarpattia Oblast of Ukraine, located adjacent to Romania, on the right bank of the Tisza River opposite the Romanian city of Sighetu Marmaţiei. The village's name comes from the nearby salt mine.

Solotvyno was first mentioned  (the former one was burned down by the Tatars in 1241). Population: . 
The large Jewish population died in the Holocaust, while the region was in Hungary. Solotvino is the final stop of the Ukrainian section of the railway, which runs from Lviv to Transcarpathia. The village has an original museum of salt miners.

Notable residents
Robert Maxwell, British MP, business owner and fraudster (1923–1991), born when the village was part of the First Czechoslovak Republic.

Gallery

References

External links 
Solotvyno 

Urban-type settlements in Tiachiv Raion
Mining cities and regions in Ukraine